Cedar Haven was a historic Greek Revival plantation house located near Faunsdale, Alabama. It was built in 1850 by Phillip J. Weaver.  Weaver was a prominent merchant and planter.  He was born in Mifflintown, Pennsylvania in 1797 and relocated to Selma from Uniontown, Maryland in 1818. He ran a very successful store in Selma and also maintained a home there.  Weaver was the paternal grandfather of the artist Clara Weaver Parrish.

When the community of Woodville, near Cedar Haven, applied for a post office, the name Woodville was already in use by another Alabama community.  Weaver suggested the name Uniontown and his suggestion remains as the name of the town until this day.  Phillip J. Weaver was killed in Selma in 1865, purportedly by a Union soldier, several months after Wilson's Raid on Selma.  The next owner of the plantation was John Davidson Alexander, born in Mecklenburg County, North Carolina in 1820.  He died in 1901.  Cedar Haven was inherited by his son, Houston Alexander, following his death.

The house featured a two-story Doric tetrasyle portico.  It was added to the National Register of Historic Places on July 13, 1993, as a part of the Plantation Houses of the Alabama Canebrake and Their Associated Outbuildings Multiple Property Submission.

The house, already badly deteriorated in 1995, was razed in the 2000s.

References

National Register of Historic Places in Marengo County, Alabama
Houses on the National Register of Historic Places in Alabama
Houses completed in 1850
Greek Revival houses in Alabama
Plantation houses in Alabama
Houses in Marengo County, Alabama
Demolished but still listed on the National Register of Historic Places
Demolished buildings and structures in Alabama